The 2019 Manitoba general election was held on September 10, 2019, to elect the 57 members to the Legislative Assembly of Manitoba.

The incumbent Progressive Conservatives, led by Premier Brian Pallister, were re-elected to a second majority government with a loss of two seats. The NDP, led by Wab Kinew, gained six seats and retained their position as the official opposition. The Liberals, led by Dougald Lamont, won the remaining three seats.

Background

Date 
Under Manitoba's Elections Act, a general election must be held no later than the first Tuesday of October in the fourth calendar year following the previous election. As the previous election was held in 2016, the latest possible date for the election was October 6, 2020, or if that would have overlapped with a federal election period, the latest possible date would be April 20, 2021.

However, incumbent Premier Brian Pallister announced instead in June 2019 that he would seek to hold the election over a year early, on September 10, 2019, in order to seek "a new mandate to keep moving Manitoba forward." Pallister visited Lieutenant Governor Janice Filmon on August 12 to officially drop the writ and begin the campaign period.

It had been speculated that Pallister would call an early election in order to take advantage of a large lead in opinion polls, and to get the vote out of the way before new and potentially unpopular budget cuts took effect. A poll taken by the Winnipeg Free Press found that while most respondents disagreed with the early election and agreed that Pallister had moved up the date for partisan reasons, such sentiments were unlikely to imperil Pallister's re-election.

Electoral boundaries 
By law, Manitoba's electoral boundaries are reviewed every 10 years. The latest review was completed the end of 2018, meaning the 2019 elections were the first ones contested using the new boundaries.

Timeline

2016
May 7: Greg Selinger resigns as leader and Flor Marcelino becomes interim Leader of the New Democratic Party of Manitoba. 
September 24: Rana Bokhari resigns as Leader of the Manitoba Liberal Party.
October 21: Judy Klassen becomes interim Leader of the Manitoba Liberal Party.

2017
January 9: Kevin Chief resigns as NDP member of the Legislative Assembly of Manitoba for Point Douglas, causing a by-election.
January 31: NDP MLA Mohinder Saran suspended from the caucus due to sexual harassment allegations.
June 13: Bernadette Smith elected member of the Legislative Assembly of Manitoba for Point Douglas holding the seat for the NDP with a reduced majority.
June 13: Judy Klassen resigns as interim leader to run for Leader of the Manitoba Liberal Party. Paul Brault becomes acting Leader of the Manitoba Liberal Party.
June 30: Progressive Conservative MLA Steven Fletcher expelled from the caucus after breaking with the party on multiple issues. 
September 16: Wab Kinew elected Leader of the New Democratic Party of Manitoba.
October 21: Dougald Lamont elected Leader of the Manitoba Liberal Party.

2018
March 7: Greg Selinger resigns as NDP member of the Legislative Assembly of Manitoba for St. Boniface, causing a by-election.
March 21: NDP MLA for Wolseley, Rob Altemeyer, announces that he will not seek re-election.
July 17: Liberal leader Dougald Lamont elected member of the Legislative Assembly of Manitoba for St. Boniface, gaining the seat from the NDP and winning official party status for the Liberals.
September 11: Steven Fletcher joins and becomes Leader of the Manitoba Party.
October 22: Progressive Conservative MLA Cliff Graydon expelled from the caucus due to sexual harassment allegations.
December 14: Final Report of the Manitoba Electoral Boundaries Commission released.
December 14: NDP MLA for Fort Garry-Riverview, James Allum, announces that he will not seek re-election.

2019
April 3: Progressive Conservative MLA for Kildonan, Nic Curry announces that he will not seek re-election.
May 22: MLA Steven Fletcher resigns as leader of the Manitoba First party.
August 12: Premier Pallister visits the lieutenant governor and calls the election for September 10.
September 10: The election is held.

Movement in seats held

Historical results from 1990 onwards

Results

|- 
!rowspan="2" colspan="2"|Party
!rowspan="2"|Leader
!rowspan="2"|Candidates
!colspan="4"|Seats
!colspan="3"|Popular vote
|-
!2016
!Dissolution
!2019
!+/-
!Votes
!%
!+/-

|align=left|
|57 ||40 |||38||36 ||-4 ||222,569||46.81 || -6.27

|align=left|Wab Kinew
|57 ||14 ||12 ||18 ||+4 ||150,016||31.55|| +5.77

|align=left|Dougald Lamont
|57 ||3 ||4 || 3|| - ||69,497||14.62||+0.22

|align=left|
|43 ||– ||– ||–||–||30,295||6.37||+1.30

|align=left|Manitoba Forward
|align=left|Wayne Sturby
|7 ||– ||–||–||–||1,339||0.28 ||

|align=left|Manitoba First
|align=left|Douglas Petrick
|6 ||– ||1 ||–|| - ||647||0.14||-0.98

|align=left|Darrell Rankin
|5 ||– ||– ||–||–||214||0.05||-0.02
|-

| colspan="2" style="text-align:left;"|Independents
|3 ||– ||2 || –|| -||854||0.18||-0.29
|-

| colspan="4" style="text-align:left;"|Vacant
| |0||||| –|| || ||
|-
| colspan="5" |
|-
| style="text-align:left;" colspan="3"|Blank and invalid votes
| || || ||||||3,495|| 0.73 || -0.76
|-
| style="text-align:left;" colspan="3"|Total
| ||57 ||57 ||57||||478,926|| 55.04|| -2.39
|-
| style="text-align:left;" colspan="3"|Registered voters/turnout
| || || ||||||870,137|| ||
|}

Synopsis of results

 = open seat
 = turnout is above provincial average
 = incumbency arose from byelection gain
 = incumbent re-elected in same riding
 = incumbent changed allegiance
 = previously incumbent in another riding
 = other incumbent renominated

Summary analysis

Seats changing hands

Nine seats changed allegiance in 2019:

PC to NDP
 Fort Garry
 St. James
 St. Vital
 Thompson
 Transcona

Liberal to NDP
 Burrows
 Keewatinook

NDP to Liberal
 St. Boniface
 Tyndall Park

Incumbents not running for reelection

Candidates by riding
 Note that names in bold type represent Cabinet members, while italics represent party leaders.

Northern Manitoba

|-
| style="background:whitesmoke;"|Flin Flon
|
|Theresa Wride  1,294 - 30.7%
||
|Tom Lindsey  2,435 - 57.8%
|
|James Lindsay  270 - 6.6%
|
|Saara Murnick  203 - 4.8%
||
|Tom Lindsey
|-
| style="background:whitesmoke;"|Keewatinook
|
|Arnold Flett  355 - 13.6%
||
|Ian Bushie  1,723 - 66.1%
|
|Jason Harper  530 - 20.3%
|
|
||
|Judy Klassen
|-
| style="background:whitesmoke;"|Swan River
||
|Rick Wowchuk  5,529 - 69.0%
|
|Shelley Wiggins  2,064 - 25.8%
|
|David Teffaine  417 - 5.2%
|
|
||
|Rick Wowchuk
|-
| style="background:whitesmoke;"|The Pas-Kameesak
|
|Ron Evans  1,324 - 24.8%
||
|Amanda Lathlin  3,054 - 57.2%
|
|Ken Brandt  178 - 3.3%
|
|Ralph McLean  780 - 14.6%
||
|Amanda Lathlin The Pas
|-
| style="background:whitesmoke;"|Thompson
|
|Kelly Bindle  1,750 - 35.9%
||
|Danielle Adams  2,651 - 54.4%
|
|Darla Contois  177 - 3.6%
|
|Meagan Jemmett  294 - 6.0%
||
|Kelly Bindle
|}

Westman/Parkland

|-
| style="background:whitesmoke;"|Agassiz
||
|Eileen Clarke  5,688 - 75.6%
|
|Kelly Legaspi  954 - 12.7%
|
|Hector Swanson  462 - 6.1%
|
|Liz Clayton  417 - 5.5%
||
|Eileen Clarke
|-
| style="background:whitesmoke;"|Turtle Mountain
||
|Doyle Piwniuk  6,202 - 67.5%
|
|Angie Herrera-Hildebrand  1,003 - 10.9%
|
|Richard Davies  623 - 6.8%
|
|David M. Neufeld  1,356 - 14.8%
||
|Doyle PiwniukArthur-Virden
|-
| style="background:whitesmoke;"|Brandon East
||
|Len Isleifson  3,272 - 51.3%
|
|Lonnie Patterson  2,311 - 36.2%
|
|Kim Longstreet  799 - 12.5%
|
|
||
|Len Isleifson
|-
| style="background:whitesmoke;"|Brandon West
||
|Reg Helwer  4,307 - 58.5%
|
|Nick Brown  1,747 - 23.7%
|
|Sunday Frangi  564 - 7.7%
|
|Robert Brown  744 - 10.1%
||
|Reg Helwer
|-
| style="background:whitesmoke;"|Dauphin
||
|Brad Michaleski  4,799 - 50.5%
|
|Darcy Scheller  4,022 - 42.4%
|
|Cathy Scofield-Singh  674 - 7.1%
|
|
||
|Brad Michaleski
|-
| style="background:whitesmoke;"|Riding Mountain
||
|Greg Nesbitt  6,117 - 66.1%
|
|Wayne Chacun  1,961 - 21.2%
|
|Jordan Fleury  454 - 4.9%
|
|Mary Lowe  723 - 7.8%
||
|Greg Nesbitt
|-
| style="background:whitesmoke;"|Spruce Woods
||
|Cliff Cullen  5,657 - 68.1%
|
|Justin Shannon  1,316 - 15.8%
|
|Jennifer Harcus  515 - 6.2%
|
|Gordon Beddome  816 - 9.8%
||
|Cliff Cullen
|}

Central Manitoba

|-
| style="background:whitesmoke;"|Borderland
||
|Josh Guenter  4,885 - 66.1%
|
|Liz Cronk  287 - 3.9%
|
|Loren Braul  1,226 - 16.6%
|
|Ken Henry  250 - 3.4%
|
|Cliff Graydon  739 - 10.0% 
||
|Cliff Graydon Emerson
|-
| style="background:whitesmoke;" rowspan="3"|Interlake-Gimli
| rowspan="3" |
|rowspan=3|Derek Johnson  6,199 - 58.8%
|rowspan=3|
|rowspan=3|Sarah Pinsent  3,472 - 32.9%
|rowspan=3|
|rowspan=3|Mary Lou Bourgeois  400 - 3.8%
|rowspan=3|
|rowspan=3|Dwight Harfield  473 - 4.5%
|rowspan=3|
|rowspan=3|
||
|Jeff Wharton‡Gimli
|-
| style="text-align:center;" colspan=2 |Merged District
|-
||
|Derek JohnsonInterlake
|-
| style="background:whitesmoke;"|Lakeside
||
|Ralph Eichler  6,394 - 68.7%
|
|Dan Rugg  2,054 - 22.1%
|
|Ilsa Regelsky  854 - 9.2%
|
|
|
|
||
|Ralph Eichler
|-
| style="background:whitesmoke;"|Midland
||
|Blaine Pedersen  6,700 - 75.0%
|
|Cindy Friesen  1,370 - 15.3%
|
|Julia Sisler  860 - 9.6%
|
|
|
|
||
|Blaine Pedersen
|-
| style="background:whitesmoke;"|Morden-Winkler
||
|Cameron Friesen  6,096 - 81.2%
|
|Robin Dalloo  365 - 4.9%
|
|David Mintz  277 - 3.7%
|
|Mike Urichuk  769 - 10.2%
|
|
||
|Cameron Friesen
|-
| style="background:whitesmoke;"|Springfield-Ritchot
||
|Ron Schuler  5,661 - 59.5%
|
|Obasesam Okoi  1,976 - 20.8%
|
|Sara Mirwaldt  813 - 8.5%
|
|Garrett Hawgood  1,065 - 11.2%
|
|
||
|Shannon Martin Morris
|-
| style="background:whitesmoke;"|Portage la Prairie
||
|Ian Wishart  4,489 - 65.5%
|
|Andrew Podolecki  1,521 - 22.2%
|
|Charles Huband  843 - 12.3%
|
|
|
|
||
|Ian Wishart
|}

Eastman

|-
| style="background:whitesmoke;"| Dawson Trail
||
|Bob Lagassé  4,548 - 55.4%
|
|Echo Asher  1,783 - 21.7%
|
|Robert Rivard  1,874 - 22.8%
|
|
|
|
||
|Bob Lagassé
|-
| style="background:whitesmoke;"|Lac du Bonnet
||
|Wayne Ewasko  6,170 - 66.1%
|
|Sidney Klassen  1,793 - 19.2%
|
|Terry Hayward  1,373 - 14.7%
|
|
|
|
||
|Wayne Ewasko
|-
| style="background:whitesmoke;"|La Verendrye
||
|Dennis Smook  5,305 - 72.8%
|
|Erin McGee  1,052 - 14.4%
|
|Lorena Mitchell  929 - 12.8%
|
|
|
|
||
|Dennis Smook
|-
| style="background:whitesmoke;"|Steinbach
||
|Kelvin Goertzen  6,237 - 81.7%
|
|Rob Jessup  614 - 8.0%
|
|LeAmber Kensley  369 - 4.8%
|
|Janine Gibson  417 - 5.5%
|
|
||
|Kelvin Goertzen
|-
| style="background:whitesmoke;"| Red River North
||
|Jeff Wharton  5,566 - 58.0%
|
|Chris Pullen  2,387 - 24.9%
|
|Noel Ngo  732 - 7.6%
|
|Graham Hnatiuk  739 - 7.7%
|
|Jocelyn Burzuik  173 - 1.8%
||
|Ron Schuler St. Paul
|-
| style="background:whitesmoke;"|Selkirk
||
|Alan Lagimodiere  4,736 - 51.4%
|
|Mitch Obach  3,319 - 35.8%
|
|Philip Olcen  480 - 5.2%
|
|Tony Hill  713 - 7.7%
|
|
||
|Alan Lagimodiere
|}

Northwest Winnipeg

|-
| style="background:whitesmoke;"|Burrows
|
|Jasmine Brar  1,680 - 26.2%
||
|Diljeet Brar  2,536 - 39.6%
|
|Sarbjit Singh Gill  1,170 - 18.3%
|
|
|
|Edda Pangilinan (MB Fwd.)  1,020 - 15.9%
||
|Cindy Lamoureux‡
|-
| style="background:whitesmoke;" rowspan="3"| Kildonan-River East
| rowspan="3" |
|rowspan=3|Cathy Cox  5,514 - 51.1%
|rowspan=3|
|rowspan=3|Elliot Macdonald  3,673 - 34.0%
|rowspan=3|
|rowspan=3|Kathryn Braun  1,602 - 14.8%
|rowspan=3|
|rowspan=3|
|rowspan=3|
|rowspan=3|
||
|Nic CurryKildonan
|-
| style="text-align:center;" colspan=2 |Merged District
|-
||
|Cathy CoxRiver East
|-
| style="background:whitesmoke;"|McPhillips
||
|Shannon Martin  3,307 - 38.3%
|
|Greg McFarlane  3,202 - 37.1%
|
|John Cacayuran  1,476 - 17.1%
|
|Jason Smith  406 - 4.7%
|
|Dave Wheeler (MF)  237 - 2.7%
|
|New Riding
|-
| style="background:whitesmoke;"|Point Douglas
|
|Michelle Redmond  757 - 15.7%
||
|Bernadette Smith  3,002 - 62.1%
|
|Richard Sanderson  565 - 11.7%
|
|Jenn Kess  398 - 8.2%
|
|Fagie Fainman (CPC-M)  44 - 1.4% Michael Wenuik (MB Fwd.)  66 - 0.9%
||
|Bernadette Smith
|-
| style="background:whitesmoke;"|St. Johns
|
|Ray Larkin  1,665 - 24.2%
||
|Nahanni Fontaine  3,526 - 51.2%
|
|Eddie Calisto-Tavares  1,092 - 15.9%
|
|Joshua McNeil  601 - 8.7%
|
|
||
|Nahanni Fontaine
|-
| style="background:whitesmoke;"|The Maples
|
|Aman Sandhu  1,824 - 25.9%
||
|Mintu Sandhu  2,744 - 39.0%
|
|Amandeep Brar  2,070 - 29.4%
|
|Kiran Gill  405 - 5.8%
|
|
||
|Mohinder Saran
|-
| style="background:whitesmoke;"|Tyndall Park
|
|Daljit Kainth  991 - 12.5%
|
|Ted Marcelino  2,447 - 30.9%
||
|Cindy Lamoureux  4,293 - 54.3%
|
|Fleur Mann  154 - 1.9%
|
|Frank Komarniski (CPC-M)  22 - 0.3%
||
|Ted Marcelino

|}

Northeast Winnipeg

|-
| style="background:whitesmoke;"|Concordia
|
|Andrew Frank  2,290 - 31.9%
||
|Matt Wiebe  4,284 - 59.7%
|
|Maria Albo  605 - 8.4%
|
|
|
|
||
|Matt Wiebe
|-
| style="background:whitesmoke;"|Elmwood
|
|Mayra Dubon  2,533 - 31.9%
||
|Jim Maloway  3,862 - 48.6%
|
|Regan Wolfrom  739 - 9.3%
|
|Nicolas Geddert  763 - 9.6%
|
|German Lombana (CPC-M)  45 - 0.6%
||
|Jim Maloway
|-
| style="background:whitesmoke;"|Radisson
||
|James Teitsma  4,523 - 47.0%
|
|Raj Sandhu  3,534 - 36.7%
|
|Tanya Hansen Pratt  997 - 10.4%
|
|Carlianne Runions  576 - 6.0%
|
|
||
|James Teitsma
|-
| style="background:whitesmoke;"|Rossmere
||
|Andrew Micklefield  4,362 - 47.0%
|
|Andy Regier  3,608 - 38.8%
|
|Isaiah Oyeleru  707 - 7.6%
|
|Amanda Bazan  613 - 6.6%
|
|
||
|Andrew Micklefield
|-
| style="background:whitesmoke;"|St. Boniface
|
|Megan Hoskins  1,889 - 19.2%
|
|Laurissa Sims  2,939 - 29.9%
||
|Dougald Lamont  4,077 - 41.5%
|
|Jaclyn Jeanson  840 - 8.6%
|
|Simone Fortier (MB Fwd.)  76 - 0.8%
||
|Dougald Lamont
|-
| style="background:whitesmoke;"|Transcona
|
|Blair Yakimoski 3,914 - 45.1%
||
|Nello Altomare  4,029 - 46.4%
|
|Dylan Bekkering  716 - 8.4%
|
|
|
|
||
|Blair Yakimoski
|}

West Winnipeg

|-
| style="background:whitesmoke;"|Assiniboia
||
|Scott Johnston  4,102 - 44.2%
|
|Joe McKellep  3,303 - 35.6%
|
|Jeff Anderson  1,224 - 13.4%
|
|John Delaat  631 - 6.8%
|
|
||
|Steven Fletcher
|-
| style="background:whitesmoke;"|Roblin
||
|Myrna Driedger  6,075 - 55.7%
|
|Sophie Brandt-Murenzi  1,886 - 17.3%
|
|Michael Bazak  1,728 - 15.9%
|
|Kevin Nichols  1,209 - 11.1%
|
|
||
|Myrna Driedger Charleswood
|-
| style="background:whitesmoke;"|Kirkfield Park
||
|Scott Fielding  5,435 - 50.3%
|
|Kurt Morton  2,767 - 25.6%
|
|Ernie Nathaniel  1,695 - 15.7%
|
|Dennis Bayomi  901 - 8.3%
|
|
||
|Scott Fielding
|-
| style="background:whitesmoke;"|St. James
|
|Michelle Richard  2,767 - 32.4%
||
|Adrien Sala  4,009 - 46.9%
|
|Bernd Hohne  965 - 11.3%
|
|Jeff Buhse  805 - 9.4%
|
|
||
|Scott Johnston‡
|-
| style="background:whitesmoke;"|Tuxedo
||
|Heather Stefanson  4,587 - 47.7%
|
|Carla Compton  1,919 - 20.0%
|
|Marc Brandson  2,225 - 23.1%
|
|Kristin Lauhn-Jensen  822 - 8.6%
|
|Abby Al-Sahi  60 - 0.6%
||
|Heather Stefanson
|}

Central Winnipeg

|-
| style="background:whitesmoke;"|Fort Garry
|
|Nancy Cooke  2,998 - 31.8%
||
|Mark Wasyliw  3,994 - 42.4%
|
|Craig Larkins  1,716 - 18.2%
|
|Casey Fennessy  722 - 7.7%
|
|
||
|James Allum Fort Garry-Riverview
|-
| style="background:whitesmoke;"|Fort Rouge
|
|Edna Nabess  1,854 - 18.9%
||
|Wab Kinew  5,031 - 51.2%
|
|Cyndy Friesen  1,285 - 13.1%
|
|James Beddome  1,579 - 16.1%
|
|Michael McCracken (MF)  54 - 0.5%Bradley Hebert (MB Fwd.)  29 - 0.3%
||
|Wab Kinew
|-
| style="background:whitesmoke;"|Notre Dame
|
|Marsha Street  789 - 15.2%
||
|Malaya Marcelino  3,361 - 64.9%
|
|Donovan Martin  702 - 13.6%
|
|Martha Jo Willard  263 - 5.1%
|
|Andrew Taylor (CPC-M)  32 - 0.6% Margaret Sturby (MB Fwd.)  28 - 0.5%
||
|Andrew Swan Minto
|-
| style="background:whitesmoke;"|River Heights
|
|Susan Boulter  2,276 - 24.4%
|
|Jonathan Niemczak  1,346 - 14.4%
||
|Jon Gerrard  5,038 - 54.0%
|
|Nathan Zahn  661 - 7.1%
|
|
||
|Jon Gerrard
|-
| style="background:whitesmoke;"|Union Station
|
|Tara Fawcett  908 - 18.0%
||
|Uzoma Asagwara  2,635 - 52.2%
|
|Harold Davis  949 - 18.8%
|
|Andrea Shalay  473 - 9.4%
|
|Elsa Cubas (CPC-M)  48 - 1.0%James Yau (MB Fwd.)  32 - 0.6%
||
|Flor Marcelino Logan
|-
| style="background:whitesmoke;"|Wolseley
|
|Elizabeth Hildebrand  831 - 8.9%
||
|Lisa Naylor  4,253 - 45.6%
|
|Shandi Strong  770 - 8.3%
|
|David Nickarz  3,336 - 35.8%
|
|Eddie Hendrickson  129 - 1.4%
||
|Rob Altemeyer
|}

South Winnipeg

|-
| style="background:whitesmoke;"|Fort Richmond
||
|Sarah Guillemard  3,241 - 42.2%
|
|George Wong  1,701 - 22.1%
|
|Tanjit Nagra  2,361 - 30.7%
|
|Cameron Proulx  379 - 4.9%
|
|
||
|Sarah Guillemard
|-
| style="background:whitesmoke;"|Fort Whyte
||
|Brian Pallister  5,609 - 57.2%
|
|Beatrice Bruske  1,755 - 17.9%
|
|Darrel Morin  1,729 - 17.6%
|
|Sara Campbell  665 - 6.8%
|
|Jason Holenski (MF) 54 - 0.6%
||
|Brian Pallister
|-
| style="background:whitesmoke;"|Lagimodière
||
|Andrew Smith  5,182 - 51.8%
|
|Billie Cross  2,789 - 27.9%
|
|Jake Sacher  1,481 - 14.8%
|
|Bob Krul  557 - 5.6%
|
|
|
|New Riding
|-
| style="background:whitesmoke;"|Riel
||
|Rochelle Squires  4,472 - 44.9%
|
|Mike Moyes  3,554 - 35.7%
|
|Neil Johnston  1,352 - 13.6%
|
|Roger Schellenberg  591 - 5.9%
|
|
||
|Rochelle Squires
|-
| style="background:whitesmoke;"|Seine River
||
|Janice Morley-Lecomte  4,363 - 45.1%
|
|Durdana Islam  2,513 - 26.0%
|
|James Bloomfield  2,147 - 22.2%
|
|Bryanne Lamoureux  658 - 6.8%
|
|
||
|Janice Morley-Lecomte
|-
| style="background:whitesmoke;"|Southdale
||
|Audrey Gordon  4,486 - 42.7%
|
|Karen Myshkowsky  3,955 - 37.6%
|
|Spencer Duncanson  1,422 - 13.5%
|
|Katherine Quinton  584 - 5.6%
|
|Robert Cairns (MB Fwd.)  70 - 0.7%
||
|Andrew Smith‡ 
|-
| style="background:whitesmoke;"|St. Vital
|
|Colleen Mayer  3,211 - 35.0%
||
|Jamie Moses  4,081 - 44.4%
|
|Jeffrey Anderson  1,271 - 13.8%
|
|Elizabeth Dickson  499 - 5.4%
|
|David Sutherland (MF)  60 - 0.7% Baljeet Sharma  62 - 0.7%
||
|Colleen Mayer
|-
| style="background:whitesmoke;"|Waverley
||
|Jon Reyes  3,265 - 50.0%
|
|Dashi Zargani  1,865 - 28.6%
|
|Fiona Haftani  1,070 - 16.4%
|
|James Ducas  325 - 5.0%
|
|
||
|Jon ReyesSt. Norbert

Opinion polls

References

Opinion poll sources

Further reading

External links
 Elections Manitoba

2019 elections in Canada
2019
2019 in Manitoba
September 2019 events in Canada